The C.S.P.S. Hall, also known as Czech Hall or as CSPS Sokol Hall, is the home of the Czech-Slovak Protective Society Hall — a recreation center and meeting house used for social events, including Sokol events; important to the cultural preservation of Czech and Slovak immigrants in Saint Paul, Minnesota. It is listed on the National Register of Historic Places.

The C.S.P.S. was founded in St. Louis, Missouri, in 1854, and, like other immigrant societies, began by offering a kind of insurance program, which provided for members when they were ill and covered funeral expenses.

References

External links
Official website
MPR story

Clubhouses on the National Register of Historic Places in Minnesota
Cultural infrastructure completed in 1887
Czech-American culture in Minnesota
Czech-Slovak Protective Society
European-American culture in Minneapolis–Saint Paul
National Register of Historic Places in Saint Paul, Minnesota
Slovak-American culture in Minnesota
Sokol in the United States